Counterstrike is a drum and bass music producer duo from Cape Town consisting of Justin Scholtemeyer and Eaton Crous. They are considered to be one of the pioneers of the South African drum and bass scene. Counterstrike are known for their composition of raw, high-energy sound inspired by metal, techno and early techstep.

Biography
Counterstrike also known as Animal Chin and 500 Mills, have been active drum & bass DJs and producers since the mid-1990s. Collectively producing since 1998, the duo drew attention for their releases on various high-profile labels such as Rob Playford's Moving Shadow, Dieselboy's Human Imprint, Barcode Recordings and Dylan's Obscene.Algorythm Recordings, their own imprint, was re-launched in 2005 and includes releases from artists such as Current Value, Limewax, SPL and T.Z.A.

Discography

Singles
 2001: Pressure / Questions (featuring Tasha Baxter) on Allied Recordings
 2003: Doom Prophet / Damaged on Core Productions
 2003: Candy Flip / Existenz on Invader
 2003: Monster Munch / Tortured Soul on Outbreak Limited
 2003: Synergy / End of Line on Cell Recordings
 2003: Metalgear (aka Counterstrike) & Impact - Evil Eye / Broken Crystal on Dynamic Recordings
 2003: Stickfight / Metal Gear on Leet Recordings
 2004: Sentinel / IO on Drop On Request
 2004: V / Misfit on Cell Recordings
 2004: Africanism / Bloodline on Outbreak Limited
 2004: Never Enough (feat. Soma) / Aeons (feat. Drop Bass) on Revolution Recordings
 2004: Spinal Tap (feat. Impact) / Diablo (feat. Psyke & Manta) on Cell Recordings
 2004: Pierced on Revolution Recordings
 2005: Killswitch / Enemy on Algorythm Recordings
 2005: Ghost / Nemesis (feat. Sunchase & Tasha) on Revolution Recordings
 2005: Bodybag / Mutilation on Obscene
 2005: Deathstar / Truth on Algorythm Recordings
 2005: Everchanging on Revolution Recordings
 2006: White Light  on Evol Intent Recordings
 2006: The Power to Distort / Motherfucking Skulls (with Eye-D) on PRSPCT Recordings
 2006: Revelation on Ohm Resistance
 2006: Snuff / Timewarp on Algorythm Recordings
 2006: Counterstrike & Genr8 - Grey Matter on Evol Intent Recordings
 2006: Triggerhappy on Guerilla Recordings
 2007: Counterstrike & Mumblz - Sickness & Suffering on Future Sickness
 2007: Counterstrike & Eye-D - The Grind on Prspct Recordings

EPs
 2005: Counterstrike – Phantasm / Merciless / Zulu Warrior / Zaire on Moving Shadow X 
 2005: Counterstrike – From Beyond The Grave EP feat. SPL, Limewax, T.Z.A on Algorythm Recordings

Albums
 2004: Counterstrike - Can't Let Go - Biolological Warfare LP on Outbreak
 2005: Counterstrike - Gateway - Us Against The World LP on Barcode Recordings
 2008: Counterstrike - Insubordination LP on Algorythm Recordings

Remixes
 2000: Krushed & Sorted - King Of The Swingers (Animal Chin RMX) on African Dope
 2003: Counterstrike - Candy Flip (Monkey & Large RMX) / Dimension Intrusion on Invader
 2003: Counterstrike - V (Resonant Evil RMX) / Synergy (Raiden RMX) on Cell Recordings
 2004: Counterstrike - Doom Prophet VIP / Damaged (Magna Karta RMX) on Core Productions
 2004: Su3ject - Rage (Counterstrike Remix) on Trickdisk
 2004: Muffler - Wreck (Counterstrike Remix) on Disturbed
 2006: KC - Extreme Steel (Counterstrike Arena Remix)  on Human Imprint
 2007: DJ G-I-S - Inner Demons (Counterstrike Remix) on Intransigent
 2008: Counterstrike & Mumblz - Sickness & Suffering (Donny Remix) on Future Sicness
 Counterstrike Vs. Josh Wink - I'm Ready VIP

CDs
 2005: Various Artists - Us Against The World on Barcode Recordings
 2005: Counterstrike - From Beyond The Grave on Algorythm Recordings 
 2008: Various Artists - Substance D on Human Imprint
 2008: Counterstrike - Insubordination on Algorythm Recordings

Featured compilations
 2001: Various Artists - Biogenesis mix CD on Algorythm Recordings
 2001: Krushed & Sorted - Acid Made Me Do It on African Dope
 2004: Counterstrike - Drum 'n Bass Singles 2002-2004 CD on Algorythm Recordings
 2004: Various Artists - Biological Warfare CD mixed By Resonant Evil on Outbreak Recordings 
 2004: Various Artists - CD mixed by Temper D on Cell Recordings 
 2005: Various Artists – Kmag51 - Mixed By Rawkiss on Knowledge Magazine 
 2005: Various Artists - First Contact - Mixed By Audio on Invader Recordings 
 2005: Various Artists - Us Against The World - Mixed by Evol Intent on Barcode Recordings
 2006: Various Artists – Kmag60 - Mixed By SPL & Limewax on Knowledge Magazine 
 2007: Various Artists - 66 Minutes Of Sickness - Mixed By Panacea on Resident Magazine 
 2007: Various Artists - Kmag70 - Mixed By Manifest on Knowledge Magazine 
 2008: Timewarp VIP, N/V/D (Counterstrike Zentraedi Remix) - Mixed By Dieselboy on Substance D

Tours
Counterstrike regularly tour within Europe, playing at events and clubs such as Therapy Sessions, Respect (LA), Kings Of The Jungle, Homegrown (Cape Town), and Renegade Hardware at The End (London).Counterstrike have performed in Austria, Belgium, Bulgaria, Croatia, Czech Republic, Estonia, Germany, Lithuania, Netherlands, Poland, Portugal, Russia, South Africa, Spain, Sweden, Switzerland, Ukraine, and the United Kingdom.

See also
 List of jungle and drum and bass artists
 :Category:Drum and bass record labels

References

External links
 
 
 

Drum and bass duos
South African drum and bass musicians
South African electronic music groups
South African dance musicians
South African DJs
Club DJs
Electronic dance music DJs